Nicolás Bastián Guerra Ruz (born 9 January 1999) is a Chilean professional footballer who plays as a forward for Chilean Primera División side Universidad de Chile.

Club career
Guerra made his professional debut in a 2017 Copa Chile match against Ñublense, by replacing Leandro Benegas. In the same tournament, he scored his first goal in a match against San Luis de Quillota. Later, he signed his first contract as professional player on December 27, 2017.

On 2021 season, he joined Ñublense on loan from Universidad de Chile.

International career
At under-20 level, Guerra represented Chile in the 2018 South American Games, winning the gold medal,

Guerra represented Chile U23 at the 2019 Maurice Revello Tournament and the 2020 Pre-Olympic Tournament. In both championships, Chile did not qualify for the second stage. Also, he played in a friendly match against Brazil U23

In September 2020, he was called up to a training microcycle of the Chile senior team.

Career statistics

Club

Notes

Honours
Chile U20
 South American Games Gold medal: 2018

References

External links
 Profile at Universidad de Chile
 

Living people
1999 births
People from Santiago
Footballers from Santiago
Chilean footballers
Chile under-20 international footballers
Universidad de Chile footballers
Ñublense footballers
Chilean Primera División players
Association football forwards
South American Games gold medalists for Chile
South American Games medalists in football
Competitors at the 2018 South American Games